El Nancito is a corregimiento in Remedios District, Chiriquí Province, Panama. Its population as of 1990 was 786; its population as of 2000 was 519.

References

Corregimientos of Chiriquí Province